Lewknor Bridge Halt railway station was a halt on the Watlington and Princes Risborough Railway which the Great Western Railway opened in 1906 to serve the Oxfordshire village of Lewknor. The opening of the halt was part of a GWR attempt to encourage more passengers on the line at a time when competition from bus services was drawing away patronage.

History
The halt was one of three that the GWR opened on the line in September 1906 to try to encourage passenger traffic in the face of increased competition from buses. It was southeast of Lewknor, on the western side of a bridge carrying the Watlington and Princes Risborough Railway over a lane known as "Shiftcutts".

A single platform was provided on which stood a wooden passenger waiting shelter and the running in board. The halt was unstaffed and in winter two hurricane lamps lit the platform at night, both being lit and extinguished by the late-turn guard. Access to the station was via a kissing gate and a flight of steps from the roadside on the south side of the bridge.

In the longer term the GWR's halt strategy did little to dissuade people from more convenient bus services. In 1957 British Railways closed the halt and withdrew passenger services from the line.

Present day
Shiftcutts (now known as Hill Road) was truncated by the building of the B4009 Watlington road which bypasses Lewknor village, cutting across the former railway alignment and obliterating the site of Lewknor Bridge Halt. Although the bridge no longer exists, the steps leading up to the halt are reported to be still extant.

References

Sources

External links
 Station on navigable 1946 O.S. map
 Image of the station in 1957

Disused railway stations in Oxfordshire
Former Great Western Railway stations
Railway stations in Great Britain opened in 1906
Railway stations in Great Britain closed in 1957
1906 establishments in England
1957 disestablishments in England